Hexafluoropropylene oxide (HFPO) is an intermediate used in industrial organofluorine chemistry; specifically it is a monomer for fluoropolymers.  This colourless gas is the epoxide of hexafluoropropylene, that is fluorinated analog of propylene oxide,  HFPO is produced by DuPont and 3M and as a precursor to the lubricant Krytox and related materials.  It is generated by oxidation of perfluoropropylene, e.g. with oxygen as well as other oxidants.

Reactivity
Fluoride catalyzes the formation of the perfluorinated polyethers such as Krytox.  The initial step entails nucleophilic attack at the middle carbon to give the perfluoropropoxide anion, which in turn attacks another monomer.  This process generates a polymer terminated by an acyl fluoride, which is hydrolyzed to the carboxylic acid which is decarboxylated with fluorine.  The net polymerization reaction can be represented as:
n+2 CF3CFCF2O  →  CF3CF2CF2O(CF(CF3)CF2O)nCF2CF3  +  CO

Upon heating above 150 °C, HFPO decomposes to trifluoroacetyl fluoride and difluorocarbene:
CF3CFCF2O   →  CF3C(O)F  +  CF2
The epoxide of tetrafluoroethylene is even more unstable with respect to trifluoracetyl fluoride.

In the presence of Lewis acids the compound rearranges to hexafluoroacetone, another important chemical intermediate.

Methanolysis affords methyl trifluoropyruvate, a reagent useful in organic synthesis:
CF3CFCF2O  +  2 MeOH  →  CF3C(O)CO2Me  +  MeF  +  2 HF

References

External links 
 HFPO data sheet from DuPont
Dyneon HFPO from 3M

Trifluoromethyl compounds
Epoxides
Perfluorinated compounds
Monomers